The Grapevine Mountains are a mountain range located along the border of Inyo County, California and Nye County, Nevada in the United States. Daylight Pass is at the southern end of the range. Most of the Grapevine Mountain chain is in Death Valley National Park.

The range was named for the wild grapes in the area.

References

See also

Mountain ranges of the Mojave Desert
Mountain ranges of Esmeralda County, Nevada
Mountain ranges of Nye County, Nevada
Mountain ranges of Inyo County, California
Death Valley
Death Valley National Park